The Yashts are a collection of twenty-one hymns in the Younger Avestan language. Each of these hymns invokes a specific Zoroastrian divinity or concept. Yasht chapter and verse pointers are traditionally abbreviated as Yt.

Overview
The word yasht derives from Middle Persian 𐭩𐭱𐭲 yašt (“prayer, worship”) probably from Avestan 𐬫𐬀𐬱𐬙𐬀‎ (yašta, “honored”), from 𐬫𐬀𐬰‎ (yaz, “to worship, honor”), from Proto-Indo-European *yeh₂ǵ- or *Hyaǵ-, and several hymns of the Yasna liturgy that "venerate by praise" are—in tradition—also nominally called yashts. These "hidden" Yashts are: the Barsom Yasht (Yasna 2), another Hom Yasht in Yasna 9–11, the Bhagan Yasht of Yasna 19–21, a hymn to Ashi in Yasna 52, another Sarosh Yasht in Yasna 57, the praise of the (hypostasis of) "prayer" in Yasna 58, and a hymn to the Ahurani in Yasna 68. Since these are a part of the primary liturgy, they do not count among the twenty-one hymns of the Yasht collection.

All the hymns of the Yasht collection "are written in what appears to be prose, but which, for a large part, may originally have been a (basically) eight-syllable verse, oscillating between four and thirteen syllables, and most often between seven and nine."

Most of the yazatas that the individual Yashts praise also have a dedication in the Zoroastrian calendar. The exceptions are Drvaspa and Vanant.

The twenty-one yashts of the collection (notes follow):

Notes

References

Bibliography

 : 35–44.

External links

 English language translations of the Yashts from 

Avesta
Zoroastrian texts